The Valses nobles et sentimentales is a suite of waltzes composed by Maurice Ravel.  The piano version was published in 1911, and an orchestral version was published in 1912. The title was chosen in homage to Franz Schubert, who had released collections of waltzes in 1823 entitled Valses nobles and Valses sentimentales. The piano edition is published with a quotation of Henri de Régnier: "…le plaisir délicieux et toujours nouveau d'une occupation inutile" (the delicious and forever-new pleasure of a useless occupation).

The suite contains an eclectic blend of Impressionist and Modernist music, which is especially evident in the orchestrated version.

Composition and background 
Ravel was intrigued by the waltz genre. By 1906, he had started composing what later would become La valse, in which he tried to epitomise everything this popular genre encompassed. In 1911, prior to the 1920 publication of La valse, he published the piano version of his suite of eight Valses nobles et sentimentales. The work was first performed on May 9, 1911 by pianist Louis Aubert, to whom the work is dedicated, at a performance of new works where the composers were not identified. It was sponsored by the Société musicale indépendante, to promote the works of more adventurous composers, without "burdening" critics with the attached labels of authorship. This was in theory supposed to encourage the critics to evaluate what they actually heard rather than simply judging the piece by the name of the composer. The collection of pieces was not well received. When the votes were tallied, the nominated composers included Erik Satie, Charles Koechlin, Vincent d'Indy and even Zoltán Kodály, but "a minute majority," Ravel recalled, "ascribed the paternity of the Valses to me." The rest of the concert included works by Antoine Mariotte, Léo Sachs, Désiré-Émile Inghelbrecht, Henri Büsser, Édouard Mignan, Hector Fraggi, Lucien Wurmser and François Couperin.

The following year an orchestrated version of the Valses was published. This work indicated that the composer wanted to create a "clearer" orchestral sound than had been the case for the preceding Ma mère l'Oye.

The orchestrated ballet version of the Valses nobles et sentimentales was named Adélaïde, ou le langage des fleurs (Adelaide: The Language of Flowers). There is a striking resemblance between this story and the plot of Giuseppe Verdi's La traviata based on the novel and play La Dame aux Camélias by Alexandre Dumas, fils.

Structure 
That Ravel wanted to identify with Franz Schubert is clear. As he said himself, "The title sufficiently indicates my intention to compose a succession of waltzes, after Schubert's example." However, unlike Schubert (who actually wrote separately-grouped noble and sentimental waltzes that, while originally published separately, are frequently published together), Ravel did not differentiate the noble waltzes from the sentimental ones. Other than the name and the waltz form, there is little similarity between Ravel's and Schubert's works.

A typical performance of all eight waltzes takes 15 minutes. They are marked:

The orchestral arrangement of the piece is written for an orchestra consisting of two flutes, two oboes, cor anglais, two clarinets (in B and A), two bassoons, four horns (in F), two trumpets, three trombones, tuba, timpani, tambourine, cymbals, snare drum, glockenspiel, triangle, bass drum, celesta, two harps, and strings.

Notes

External links 
 
Recording of movements 1–2, movements 3–5, and movements 6–8 of Valses nobles et sentimentales, by Thérèse Dussaut, in MP3 format

Suites by Maurice Ravel
Compositions for solo piano
Orchestral suites
Waltzes
1911 compositions
1912 compositions
Music with dedications